The Last of Mrs. Cheyney may refer to:

The Last of Mrs. Cheyney (play), a 1925 play by Frederick Lonsdale
The Last of Mrs. Cheney (1929 film), a 1929 adaptation starring Norma Shearer and Basil Rathbone
The Last of Mrs. Cheney (1937 film), a 1937 adaptation starring Joan Crawford and William Powell
The Last of Mrs. Cheney (1961 film), a 1961 adaptation starring Lilli Palmer

See also
The Law and the Lady (1951 film), an adaptation starring Greer Garson